Lieutenant general (abbreviated 'LTGEN' and pronounced 'Lef-tenant General') is the third-highest active rank of the Bosnian Army and was created as a direct equivalent of the British military rank of lieutenant general.

The rank of lieutenant general is held by the Chief of Army. The rank is also held when an army officer is the Vice Chief of the Defence Force, the Chief of Joint Operations, or the chief of capability development.

The insignia for a lieutenant general is the crown of three crowned-type stars, and the Bosnia and Herzegovina coat of arms with two swords circled by laurel wreath, below the stars.

References

Military ranks of Bosnia and Herzegovina
 Bosnia and Herzegovina